Timothy D. Deratany (born October 19, 1939) was an American politician in the state of Florida.

Early life

Deratany was born in Michigan and came to Florida in 1947. He is a businessman. He served in the Florida House of Representatives for the 47th district from 1978 to 1984, as a Republican. He also served in the Florida State Senate from 1984 to 1990. He was the first Republican Chairman of the Senate Finance and Tax Committee since reconstruction. Deratany had served as the Mayor of the Town of Indialantic from 1970 to 1977. He has been a member of the Florida Council on Arts and Culture since 2010, having been appointed by Governor Charlie Crist.

References

1939 births
Living people
Politicians from Detroit
Republican Party members of the Florida House of Representatives
Eckerd College alumni